Raman Sundrum (born 1964) is an Indian-American theoretical particle physicist. He contributed to the field with a class of models called the Randall–Sundrum models, first published in 1999 with Lisa Randall.
Sundrum is a Distinguished University Professor at the University of Maryland and the director of Maryland Center for Fundamental Physics.

Biography
Sundrum did his undergraduate studies at University of Sydney in Australia and received his Ph.D. from Yale University in 1990. He was one of two Alumni Centennial Professors in the Department of Physics and Astronomy of the Johns Hopkins University. He was elected a Fellow of the American Physical Society in 2003 "for his discoveries in supergravity and in theories of extra dimensions, and for applications to testable models of fundamental physics".

In 2010, Sundrum left Johns Hopkins and moved to the University of Maryland. His research is in theoretical particle physics and focuses on theoretical mechanisms and observable implications of extra spacetime dimensions, supersymmetry, and strongly coupled dynamics.

According to Scientific American, he was considering leaving physics for finance, when he called collaborator Lisa Randall to propose working together on membranes, or "branes" as they are known. Branes are domains or swaths of several spatial dimensions within a higher-dimensional space. The fruits of that collaboration were papers known as RS-1 and RS-2.

Honors and awards
 2019: J. J. Sakurai Prize for Theoretical Particle Physics from the American Physical Society "For creative contributions to physics beyond the Standard Model, in particular the discovery that warped extra dimensions of space can solve the hierarchy puzzle, which has had a tremendous impact on searches at the Large Hadron Collider."

References

External links
Professor Sundrum's website at Department of Physics University of Maryland, College Park

1964 births
Living people
Yale University alumni
21st-century American physicists
American people of Indian descent
Johns Hopkins University faculty
Indian particle physicists
American string theorists
University of Sydney alumni
University of Maryland, College Park faculty
20th-century Indian physicists
Fellows of the American Physical Society
J. J. Sakurai Prize for Theoretical Particle Physics recipients